Conospermum petiolare is a shrub endemic to Western Australia.

It blooms between October and March producing pink-cream-orange-yellow-brown flowers.

It is found on rocky slopes and winter wet areas along the south coast in the Great Southern and Goldfields-Esperance regions of Western Australia where it grows in sandy soils over granite or quartzite.

References

External links

petiolare
Endemic flora of Western Australia
Eudicots of Western Australia
Plants described in 1830
Taxa named by Robert Brown (botanist, born 1773)